Czersk Świecki is a village in the administrative district of Gmina Jeżewo, within Świecie County, Kuyavian-Pomeranian Voivodeship, in north-central Poland. The village is mostly surrounded by farmland.

The village has a population of 433.

References

Villages in Świecie County